Venerable Nicetas (Nikita) Stylites was a 12th-century Russian saint who founded the Monastery of St. Nicetas on the eastern shore of Lake Pleshcheyevo in Zalesye.

Nikita led a dissolute life in his youth.  However, upon entering a church on a certain occasion he heard the words of the Prophet Isaiah (1:16) 'Wash you (of your sins), make you clean;' with this a profound conversion was effected in his soul.

Thus converted Nikita left all he possessed and entered upon the ascetic life near Pereyaslavl.  His discipline led him to bind himself in chains and enclose himself within a pillar, thus the title 'stylite'.  He became well known as a healer.

Nikita Stylites was killed on May 16, 1186 during a robbery, the thieves having believed the hermit to have been bound by silver chains.

Venerable Nikita is commemorated May 24 by the Eastern Orthodox Church.

See also

Pole-sitting
Nikitsky Monastery
God: Sole Satisfier

References

Sources
Russian Orthodox Church, Texas

1186 deaths
Stylites
Russian saints of the Eastern Orthodox Church
Year of birth missing
12th-century Eastern Orthodox Christians
12th-century Christian monks
12th-century Christian saints